Associação Garibaldi de Esportes, commonly known as Garibaldi, is a Brazilian football club based in Garibaldi, Rio Grande do Sul state.

History
The club was founded on August 18, 1998, as Guarany, but was eventually renamed to Associação Garibaldi de Esportes. They competed for the first time in a professional competition in 2004, when they were eliminated in the Second Stage in the Campeonato Gaúcho Second Level.

Stadium
Associação Garibaldi de Esportes play their home games at Estádio Alcides Santa Rosa. The stadium has a maximum capacity of 5,000 people.

References

Association football clubs established in 1998
Football clubs in Rio Grande do Sul
1998 establishments in Brazil